The Dukla Pass (502 m AMSL) is a strategically significant mountain pass in the Laborec Highlands of the Outer Eastern Carpathians, on the border between Poland and Slovakia (Lemkivshchyna) and close to the western border of Ukraine.

The Dukla Pass is the lowest mountain pass in the Carpathian Mountains main range. Located south of Dukla in Poland and northeast of Prešov in Slovakia, the pass is acknowledged as an area where Eastern and Western Slavic cultures meet.

In the 17th century, it was the haunt of a bandit and folk hero, Andrij Savka.
The Dukla Pass was the scene of bitterly contested battles on the eastern fronts of both World War I and World War II (Battle of the Dukla Pass).

Further reading
 Military History - Northeast Slovakia 1944 Annotated Soviet Battle Maps & Topographical Maps for Eastern Czechoslovakia (Slovakia) including Dukla Pass
 Battle for Dukla Pass at Eastern Slovakia Research Strategies

Mountain passes of Slovakia
Mountain passes of the Carpathians
Poland–Slovakia border crossings